Virgil Economu (21 November 1896 – 1978) was a Romanian rugby player, football manager, journalist and a writer.

Life and career
Virgil Economu was born in Bucharest, being half Jewish from his mother's side. He spent his high school years in Vienna, and graduated the University of Agronomy from Montpellier, where he also played rugby for the local team. In 1923 he founded the first school of football referees from Romania and started his coaching career. In the 1930s he was the deputy minister of Agronomy in Romania and he also worked in the press, being the director of the "Sportul Capitalei" newspaper, the head of the sports section from "Curentul" and a sports announcer. In 1937 Economu was hired as technical director at Romania's national team and in 1938 he founded the first coaching school from Romania, while in 1939 he was named head coach of the national team. In 1940, Romania had to play a friendly in Frankfurt against Germany but Economu did not receive an entrance visa because of his Jewish origin, but Romania's Football Federation president Gabriel Marinescu wrote a letter to Wilhelm Fabricius who was Adolf Hitler's minister from Bucharest, in which he asked him to give Economu an entrance visa, claiming he is of ethnic Romanian origin. Economu received the visa and the game ended with a 9–3 victory for Germany. He also suffered discrimination in Romania because of his Jewish origins, being fired in October 1940 from the post of General Inspector at the Center for the Capitalization of Wheat and in December 1941 his name disappeared from the army records, where he was listed as a lieutenant in reserve, a decision published in Romania's Official Gazette. In 1945 he actively participated in the reorganization of the Romanian Football Federation and in the appearance of the "Sportul Popular" newspaper. From 1946 until 1947 he was the Romanian Football Federation's president and he named himself as head coach of the national team, leading it at the 1946 Balkan Cup, he has a total 14 games (4 victories, 3 draws, 7 losses) as Romania's coach. From 1953 until 1957 he was technical director at CCA București. Between 1962 and 1966 he held the position of coordinating director at "23 August", which was the first center for children and juniors from Romania. From 1967 until 1968, Economu was Ilie Savu's counselor at Steaua București and from 1967 until 1974 he worked again for the Romanian Football Federation.

Writing
Virgil Economu wrote a total of six volumes, all of them being about football:
 Fotbal – studiu documentar și critic (Football – documentary and critical study) (1935)
 Fotbal – contribuții la studiul unei metode unitare de joc, cu aplicații la echipa C.C.A. (Football – contributions to the study of a unitary method of play, with applications to the C.C.A. team) (1958)
 Fotbal – probleme de tactică in jocul modern (Football – tactical problems in the modern game) (1964)
 Sistemul de patru fundasi (The four-defender system) (1965)
 Fotbalul modern simplificat si 400 de intrebari si raspunsuri (Simplified modern football and 400 questions and answers) (1972)
 Fotbal de la Mexico la Munchen (Football from Mexico to Munich) (1972)

Honours

Manager
Gloria CFR Arad 
Divizia A runner-up: 1929–30

References

1896 births
1978 deaths
Romanian rugby union players
Romanian football managers
Romania national football team managers
Presidents of the Romanian Football Federation
Romanian sports executives and administrators
Romanian sportswriters
Romanian journalists
20th-century Romanian writers
Romanian male writers
20th-century Romanian male writers
Jewish Romanian sportspeople
Romanian Jews
Sportspeople from Bucharest
20th-century journalists
Romanian expatriates in Austria
Romanian expatriates in France